Michael Harold Batesole (born March 28, 1964) is an American former baseball coach. He previously served as coach of the Cal State Northridge Matadors (1996–2002) and the Fresno State Bulldogs (2003–2022).

Early life, playing career, and education
Born in Anaheim, California, Batesole graduated from Garden Grove High School in 1982 and began his college baseball career at Oral Roberts University. At Oral Roberts, Batesole started at third base from 1983 to 1985 and finished with a .285 batting average, 31 home runs, and 148 runs batted in.

From 1985 to 1988, Batesole played minor league baseball in the Los Angeles Dodgers organization. In 1990, Batesole completed his bachelor's degree in kinesiology at California State University, Fullerton. He later completed a master's degree in biomechanics from the same university. During his graduate studies, Batesole was an instructor in the Health and Physical Education Department.

Coaching career

Assistant coach (1986–1995)
From 1986 to 1987 and again in 1991, Batesole was an assistant coach at Orange Coast College, a junior college in Costa Mesa, California. After completing his master's degree, Batesole was an assistant coach at another Southern California junior college in the 1993 season, Cypress College.

Batesole joined the coaching staff of Bill Kernen at Cal State Northridge in July 1993. As an assistant, Batesole specialized in coaching infielders and calling the offense.

Cal State Northridge (1996–2002)
Following the resignation of Kernen in August 1995, Cal State Northridge promoted Batesole to interim head coach. Batesole led Cal State Northridge to a 52–18 record, NCAA Regionals runner-up appearance, and first Western Athletic Conference (WAC) title in school history in his debut season of 1996. Cal State Northridge promoted Batesole long-term as head coach in July 1996. 

Batesole led Cal State Northridge through its transition out of the WAC to independence (1997 to 2000) to the Big West Conference in 2001. In its first year of independence in 1997, Cal State Northridge went 42–20–1. After leading a team largely consisting of freshmen and junior college transfers to a 37–19 record in 1998, Batesole earned National Coach of the Year honors from Collegiate Baseball.

The Big West Coach of the Year in 2002, Batesole reached his 250th career win that season and led Cal State Northridge to a 41–17 season, its first Big West title, as well as an NCAA Regionals appearance. In seven seasons from 1996 to 2002, Batesole led Cal State Northridge to a cumulative 256–158–1 record, the second most wins for a head coach in program history.

Fresno State (2003–2022)
On May 28, 2002, California State University, Fresno hired Batesole to be head coach of the Fresno State Bulldogs baseball team following the retirement of 34-year head coach Bob Bennett.

Batesole led Fresno State to six WAC Tournament titles: four straight from 2006 to 2009 and two more in 2011 and 2012, in addition to five WAC regular season titles: three straight from 2006 to 2008 and two more from 2010 to 2011. Fresno State moved from the WAC to Mountain West Conference (MW) beginning in the 2013 season. In 2016, Fresno State won the MW regular season title for its first championship in that conference, for which Batesole won MW Coach of the Year honors.

On December 8, 2022, Batesole retired from coaching.

2008 national championship

In 2008, he coached Fresno State to their first College World Series appearance in seventeen years by defeating #3 Arizona State, and then defeating #6 Rice University, #2 University of North Carolina to advance to the championship, and then defeating #8 University of Georgia in the final two games in a best two-out-of-three championship series winning 19–10 in the second game, and 6–1 in the third game to win Fresno State their first NCAA Men's Championship.

Head coaching records
The following is a list of Batesole's yearly records as an NCAA head baseball coach.

References

External links
Official bio

1964 births
Living people
Bakersfield Dodgers players
Baseball first basemen
Baseball third basemen
Cal State Northridge Matadors baseball coaches
California State University, Fullerton alumni
California State University, Fullerton faculty
Fresno State Bulldogs baseball coaches
Great Falls Dodgers players
Oral Roberts Golden Eagles baseball players
San Antonio Missions players
Vero Beach Dodgers players
Orange Coast Pirates baseball coaches
People from Garden Grove, California
Baseball players from Anaheim, California
Baseball coaches from California